Tyrosine-protein kinase CSK also known as C-terminal Src kinase is an enzyme that, in humans, is encoded by the CSK gene. This enzyme phosphorylates tyrosine residues located in the C-terminal end of Src-family kinases (SFKs) including SRC, HCK, FYN, LCK, LYN and YES1.

Function 

This Non-receptor tyrosine-protein kinase plays an important role in the regulation of cell growth, differentiation, migration and immune response. CSK acts by suppressing the activity of the Src family of protein kinases by phosphorylation of Src family members at a conserved C-terminal tail site in Src. Upon phosphorylation by other kinases, Src-family members engage in intramolecular interactions between the phosphotyrosine tail and the SH2 domain that result in an inactive conformation. To inhibit SFKs, CSK is then recruited to the plasma membrane via binding to transmembrane proteins or adapter proteins located near the plasma membrane and ultimately suppresses signaling through various surface receptors, including T-cell receptor (TCR) and B-cell receptor (BCR) by phosphorylating and maintaining inactive several effector molecules.

Role in development and regulation 

Tyrosine-protein kinase CSK is involved in the following developmental, metabolic, and signal transduction cascades:

Adherens junction organization, blood coagulation, brain development, cell differentiation, cell migration, cellular response to peptide hormone stimulus, central nervous system development, epidermal growth factor receptor signaling pathway, innate immune response, epithelium morphogenesis, regulation of bone resorption, negative regulation of cell proliferation, negative regulation of ERK1 and ERK2 cascade, negative regulation of Golgi to plasma membrane protein transport, negative regulation of interleukin-6 production, negative regulation of kinase activity, negative regulation of low-density lipoprotein particle clearance, negative regulation of phagocytosis, dendrocyte differentiation, peptidyl-tyrosine autophosphorylation, platelet activation, positive regulation of MAP kinase activity, regulation of cell proliferation, regulation of cytokine production, regulation of Fc receptor mediated stimulatory signaling pathway, T cell costimulation, T cell receptor signaling pathway.

Expression and subcellular location 

CSK is expressed in the lungs and macrophages as well as several other tissues. Tyrosine-Kinase CSK is mainly present in the cytoplasm, but also found in lipid rafts making cell-cell junction.

Mutations 

 Y184F – Abolishes phosphorylation.
 Y304F – Decreases activity by two-thirds and alters conformation.
 S364A – Strong decrease of phosphorylation by PRKACA (the catalytic subunit of protein kinase A).

Clinical significance 

Csk's interaction with a phosphatase ("Lyp", gene product of PTPN22) is possibly associated with the increased autoimmune diseases associated with PTPN22 mutations.

References

External links 
 

Tyrosine kinases